Fikšinci (in older sources also Fukšlinci, Prekmurje Slovene: Fükšinci) is a village in the Municipality of Rogašovci in the Prekmurje region of northeastern Slovenia.

The local church in the centre of the village is dedicated to Our Lady of the Snows. It is a simple single-nave building with a polygonal apse and a belfry, built in 1850.

References

External links

Fikšinci on Geopedia

Populated places in the Municipality of Rogašovci